North Carolina Highway 137 (NC 137) is a  highway entirely in Gates County, North Carolina. NC 137 runs from NC 37 in Gatesville to US Highway 13/US Highway 158 (US 13/US 158) north of Winton.

Route description
NC 137 starts at US 13/US 158 north of Winton, North Carolina. NC 137 heads southeast towards Eure, North Carolina. After passing through Eure. NC 137 passes over Jady Branch. NC 137 enters Gatesville on Court Street and reaches the east end of its route at NC 37 in downtown Gatesville.

The entire route is concurrent with North Carolina Bicycle Route 4 (North Trace Line).

History
NC 137 was created in 1973 as an upgrade of SR 1112. The original routing was the same as the current.

Junction list

References

External links

 
 NCRoads.com: N.C. 137

Transportation in Gates County, North Carolina
137